is a national highway connecting Osaka and Wakayama in Japan.

Route data
Length: 71.8 km (44.6 mi)
Origin: Osaka (originates at the terminus of Route 1)
Terminus: Wakayama (ends at the terminus of Routes 24 and 42)
Major cities: Sakai, Kishiwada, Izumisano

History
4 December 1952 - First Class National Highway 26 (from Osaka to Wakayama)
1 April 1965 - General National Highway 26 (from Osaka to Wakayama)

Intersects with

Osaka Prefecture
Wakayama Prefecture

References

026
Roads in Osaka Prefecture
Roads in Wakayama Prefecture